Ultra Magnus is a fictional character from the various Transformers storylines in the Transformers franchise, generally appearing as a chief lieutenant of Optimus Prime.

Transformers: Generation 1

Despite his incredible fighting skills, courage, and unmatched talent for improvisation on the battlefield, Ultra Magnus is not portrayed as a natural leader, and displays discomfort if the Autobot Matrix of Leadership should ever find itself placed upon him.

In Generation One, Ultra Magnus is a commander of the Wreckers (Transformers), and his reluctance to change ensures that he expends all options before accepting the idea that he is required to lead. As a leader, Magnus is resolute, fair, and courageous, ever-ready to sacrifice himself for the greater good of his companions and mission, and unyielding in preparation for the protection of those under his command. Although not interested in overall command, Ultra Magnus was the City Commander for Autobot City in The Transformers: The Movie, and his toy also featured him in the role of City Commander (a title also held by his original opposite number, the Decepticon leader Galvatron), which indicates that he at least is willing to accept a leadership role in a smaller capacity rather than as supreme commander, a role filled by both Optimus Prime and later Rodimus Prime.

Ultra Magnus is armed with missile launchers capable of hitting a target 30 miles away and transforms into a car carrier able to transport his fellow Autobot troops.

Animated series

The Transformers

Ultra Magnus makes his first appearance in the Japan-exclusive Transformers: Scramble City (1986). Scramble City never made it to the United States, so most Americans did not see him until the 1986 animated film.

Ultra Magnus made his first continuity appearance in the Earth year 2005 as commander of Autobot City on Earth. Leading the defense of the city when it came under the Decepticon attack, Magnus suddenly found himself commanding the entire Autobot army when Optimus Prime died after his epic fight with Megatron and passed the Matrix of Leadership to him despite his protestations. Subsequently, in a confrontation with the Decepticons on the planet of Junk, Magnus was blown apart and lost the Matrix to Galvatron, but was reassembled and reactivated by the Junkions. When Hot Rod recovered the Matrix from Galvatron and became Rodimus Prime, Ultra Magnus decided to step down as leader to give the role to Rodimus, but continued to act as his friend and advisor, keeping him on the straight and narrow and always reassuring him, attempting to urge him out of the shadow of Optimus Prime.

Magnus had his share of personal adventures in 2006, such as when he was captured by a Quintesson scientist for study, along with the Wreck-Gar, Marissa Faireborn and Cyclonus; he and Cyclonus developed a mutual, grudging respect for each other as warriors during the ensuing events, as they worked together to escape a negative universe on the other side of a black hole.

Magnus would later fall afoul of an unrepentant Cyclonus when he went to the aid of Wheelie and Daniel Witwicky when they stumbled into trouble while attempting to discover Magnus's birthday. In addition to these and other battles with Cyclonus, Magnus also found himself facing Galvatron on several occasions - the deranged Decepticon would even occasionally focus his rage more upon Magnus than Rodimus Prime; such a notion is not inappropriate, since Magnus was the being he was originally dispatched to destroy, and who thwarted him in varying ways, certainly enough to permanently earn the deranged Galvatron's ire.

In the episode "Only Human", Ultra Magnus, Springer, Rodimus, and Arcee found their minds transferred into human-mimicking "synthoid" bodies by the human crime lord Victor Drath.

In Episode 78, "Madman's Paradise", Spike Witwicky and his wife Carly hosted a banquet for a visiting ambassador. Their son Daniel got bored and wandered off. Grimlock followed him, and they fell into a lost chamber where Quintessons banished their criminals to other dimensions. They slipped through to the sorcerous other-dimensional realm of Menonia and were tricked into fighting on the Red Wizard's side, only to find out that he was the Quintesson criminal, who overthrew the Golden One. Ultra Magnus, Blaster, Eject, Rewind, Ramhorn, and Steeljaw followed, and using Blaster's amplification, they help the Golden One defeat the Red Wizard. With the help of Perceptor, the Autobots and Daniel are returned to Cybertron.

When the galaxy became infected by the Hate Plague, Ultra Magnus was one of the first victims, and his calm, restrained soldier attitude was stripped away, leaving behind a raving, battle-hungry maniac who had a particular interest in destroying Rodimus Prime. After the plague was cured by the resurrected Optimus Prime, Magnus subsequently led the defense of Cybertron during the battle for the power of the Plasma Energy Chamber in 2007.

In The Transformers: The Movie, Ultra Magnus was voiced by Robert Stack. For  subsequent episodes of the animated series, he was voiced by Jack Angel, who had previously portrayed characters such as Astrotrain, Ramjet, and Omega Supreme. His character was most familiar for uttering the line "I can't deal with that now" whenever things got bad.

Transformers: The Headmasters
Although the American animated series ended with the three-parter "The Rebirth" storyline, it was decided in Japan to continue production of new episodes. To that end, "The Rebirth" wasn't aired there, and in its place, a new 35-episode series, Transformers: The Headmasters was in production.

Earlier Japanese-exclusive media such as Scramble City and TV Magazine's manga stories had previously detailed Ultra Magnus's earlier arrival on Earth and his role in the creation of Metroplex. In Headmasters, Magnus was a supporting character for the early part of the series, once again in charge of Autobot City on Earth, taking a proactive role in the defense of the planet against the Decepticons when they re-emerged in 2011. During the opening skirmish of the renewed conflict, Magnus crossed swords with the large and powerful Decepticon ninja, Sixshot, who went on to lead the villains' earth-based forces, leading to a smoldering enmity between the two. Their rivalry eventually came to a conclusive end when Sixshot and Magnus engaged in a one-on-one duel. Magnus was no match for the multiple powers of Sixshot's numerous transformations and was felled by his seventh, secret mode. With his dying gasp, Magnus told the Autobots to protect the Earth. At Metroplex's request, the Autobots buried Magnus on Earth.

When Ultra Magnus died, his body didn't turn monochromatic, like all other Transformers who had died in the past (including those in the Headmasters series). Whether this is due to his body being composed of external armor over his truck-cab exoskeleton (like the original toy and Dreamwave comic), or simply because of animator error, is open to fan interpretation.

As "The Headmasters" cartoon is set in an alternative "Japanese continuity" which officially doesn't belong to the original American series that ended with the 4th season in a three-piece episode titled "The Rebirth", Ultra Magnus did not die in the scope of the original continuity.

Marvel Comics
Ultra Magnus did not appear in Marvel Comics' American Transformers comic book series outside of a comic book adaptation of a third-season episode of the animated Transformers series. However, the series' sister title in the U.K. did feature in the character extensively in its own original stories (particularly issues in and around the 100 mark); the American stories made little use of the new cast introduced in The Transformers: The Movie, and U.K. writer Simon Furman pounced on the opportunity to use them in his own ways. Whereas all the other movie characters who appeared in the stories — such as Galvatron, Hot Rod and Kup — appeared via the use of time travel, it was Ultra Magnus's present-day self who played a key role in many of the important UK storylines. As per the original intent of his character and toy, Magnus was presented as the arch-foe of Galvatron.

Ultra Magnus was first introduced — and, debatably, first constructed — in the Earth year 1986, as the underground Autobot resistance on Cybertron prepared to execute their daring "Operation: Volcano" plan, which would involve luring the Decepticons' crack troops to one location where Magnus and the Autobot commando squad, the Wreckers, would finish them off. However, when the Matrix Flame (a flame denoting the activity of the robot containing the Creation Matrix) suddenly extinguished, Magnus was dispatched to Earth to discover what had happened to Optimus Prime.

With time nipping at his heels, the launch of Operation: Volcano going ahead whether he returned or not, Magnus allied himself with the Earth Autobots and worked to discover what had caused Optimus Prime, Prowl and Ratchet to vanish from the middle of the Autobot base, while the other Autobots battled the threat posed by Galvatron, a Decepticon who had traveled back in time from the future. The appearance of three more Autobots from the future, Hot Rod, Kup, and Blurr, gave Magnus his answer: the mass-displacement effect yielded by Galvatron's time travel had shunted Prime and the others into the limbo between dimensions. Ultra Magnus then engaged Galvatron in battle as Kup and the others set up a scheme to force Galvatron back into the future, and even though Magnus was severely beaten by the more powerful Decepticon, the plan succeeded and the future Decepticon returned to his own time. Magnus, however, was too late to return for Operation: Volcano, but the plan was nullified when the intended Decepticon victims were called away by Megatron, but a parting shot took the life of the Wreckers' leader, Impactor.

In 1987, when Optimus Prime was transported to Cybertron, Ultra Magnus and the Wreckers nearly killed him due to deliberate Decepticon misinformation that claimed he was a masquerading Decepticon agent which was disproved by Emirate Xaaron. Prime and Magnus then fought side-by-side on Cybertron for a period, until Ratbat cleverly deployed the Spacebridge to displace Magnus, Prime, and an insane Megatron to Earth. As Magnus adjusted to his temporary new home, he stumbled across Galvatron, who had returned from the future with a new scheme to harness the power of the Earth's core. Continuing their deeply bitter feud, Galvatron battled Ultra Magnus with help from the future Autobots, but in the end, the two leaders were entombed in volcanic lava.

Galvatron was eventually able to effect his own release, and the Sparkler Mini-Bots (also known as the Sparkabots) extricated Ultra Magnus, who, by this stage, having suffered repeated defeats at Galvatron's hands, had developed a paralyzing fear of confronting the Decepticon. Galvatron, to his own amusement, set about pulverizing the Sparklers, with the intention of further tormenting the temporarily quiescent Ultra Magnus. With his comrades' lives at risk, Magnus overcame his demons to defeat Galvatron.

The present-day Ultra Magnus would not have to face Galvatron again, but more terrifying threats were in store when he and the Sparklers returned to Cybertron and discovered that the city of Kalis had been overridden by hordes of zombie Transformers, reactivated by the renegade Autobot mad scientist, Flame. Ultra Magnus joined forces with the Wreckers and their allies to defeat Flame's plan to fire Cybertron's subterranean planetary engines and complete Megatron's ancient plan to turn the world into a huge battleship.

Soon after, Magnus found himself involved in a grotesque illegal Gladiatorial game, and although he defeated his monstrous opponent and delivered a stirring speech to the crowd decrying their spectation of such a sport, his words failed to get through.

Although that was the last appearance of the present-day Ultra Magnus, the future version of Ultra Magnus (from the same era as Rodimus Prime) made further appearances. He was present when Rodimus Prime, Kup, and Blurr went back in time to confront Galvatron and Death's Head, stating his doubts about the mission, teamed up with Soundwave's Decepticons to defeat the Quintessons, and was part of Rodimus Prime's team in the Time Wars. He did not get his final confrontation with Galvatron, however, as Galvatron used Decepticon leader Scorponok as a living shield against Magnus' fire, prompting Scorponok's troops to attack him.

The U.K. Transformers continuity records that Magnus and the other future Autobots returned find to their own time-stream changed to a different, darker future, where Galvatron was alive and ruling most of Cybertron.

Books
Ultra Magnus appeared in the 1986 story and coloring book The Lost Treasure of Cybertron by Marvel Books.

Ultra Magnus appeared in the 1986 story book Galvatron's Air Attack by Ladybird Books.

Ultra Magnus appeared in the 1986 Ladybird Books story Decepticon Hideout by John Grant.

Dreamwave Productions
Ultra Magnus from Dreamwave Productions' 21st-century re-imagining of the Generation One universe took the opportunity to indulge two contentious aspects of Ultra Magnus previously resigned to fan speculation: here, he was revealed to be Optimus Prime's "brother" in the Dreamwave continuity, and also hinted to be Dion, a childhood friend of Optimus Prime from the animated series, due to the name of a strike force he led.

Magnus first chronological appearance was in The War Within: Age of Wrath miniseries, where he had united the splintered Autobot factions such as the Wreckers and Lightning Strike Coalition (who had struck out on their own following Optimus Prime and Megatron's disappearance in a Space Bridge accident) and managed to negotiate a settlement with the Decepticons and Ultracons. The plan was derailed first by Starscream's Predacons and then by Megatron's return with an army of Seeker clones, with Grimlock taking a fatal shot meant for Magnus. After being beaten into submission by Megatron, Magnus was amongst those captured by the Decepticons. The closure of Dreamwave prevented the completion of the series.

Following the disappearance of Optimus Prime and Megatron's troops four million years ago, Ultra Magnus and Fortress Maximus took fluctuating joint leadership of the Autobots until Maximus abandoned the war.

Ultra Magnus appeared as a major character in Dreamwave Productions' Micromasters mini-series. In issue #1, "Destined For Nothing", Countdown and Groundshaker return from space to find the Autobot base largely abandoned. The first Autobots they encounter, Topspin and Twin Twist seem surprised to see them, and more surprised that Optimus Prime isn't with them. Countdown and Groundshaker are equally surprised that Optimus has not returned to Cybertron before they did. Countdown confronts Ultra Magnus and Fortress Maximus and informs them that Operation: Containment, an attempt to prevent the Decepticon threat from spreading beyond Cybertron, has failed. Countdown explains that the Decepticon Skystalker and his forces ravaged the peaceful planet, Paradron and that the Autobots need to mount an intergalactic patrol force to prevent the same fate from befalling other worlds. Ultra Magnus and Fortress Maximus disagree, stating that Autobot forces are already underpowered and spread thin as it is. Groundshaker interrupts, belligerently demanding the Autobot command take action before he is pulled from the room by Countdown. As Countdown and Groundshaker leave the command center, they overhear Big Daddy and his patrol griping about the day's events, which interests Countdown greatly. Big Daddy and company then confront Magnus and Maximus, upset that Crunch lost his life defending Roadbuster. The argument grows more heated before Fortress Maximus orders the Hot Rod Patrol to turn in their weapons and dismisses them.

100,000 years later, the Transformers, their war, and the entire planet of Cybertron itself ground to a halt when the world's energy supplies completely ran out, sending Cybertron into a period of reconstructive hibernation, during which the entire population was sent into stasis.

Three thousand years ago, Shockwave was the first Transformer to be reactivated, and set about restoring the planet and its populace, quietly working towards his own sinister ends. Unifying the Autobot and Decepticon factions, he appointed Ultra Magnus as his second-in-command, who led the attack on the Ark when they traveled to Earth and arrested Optimus Prime and Megatron as war criminals. (In reference to the theory that Ultra Magnus was formerly Dion, the name of the team Ultra Magnus led to take the Autobots into custody was team Dion.)

When Optimus Prime then led a rebel attack on Iacon, Shockwave turned on Magnus, apparently deactivating him. Ultra Magnus survived, however, and his inner robot emerged from his damaged larger form, teaming with Prime to stop Shockwave's plan to use the Matrix to access Vector Sigma.

Ultra Magnus came away from the encounter with less damage than Prime and soon had his systems repaired. He was seen in his familiar blue outer shell assisting Prowl when the burden of leadership threatened to become too much for him and headed a mission to one of Cybertron's moons to fortify it against attack. Dreamwave's bankruptcy and subsequent closure, however, meant that any further stories of Ultra Magnus went untold.

Fun Publications
The Transformers: Classics story printed by Fun Publications is set in a continuation of the Marvel Comics Transformers series, ignoring the Marvel U.K. and Generation 2 comics. Since Ultra Magnus only appeared in the U.K. comics (baring the movie adaption), the Ultra Magnus appearing in these stories is a new character.

In Transformers: Timelines volume 2 #2, "Games of Deception" this series Ultra Magnus leads a team of Autobots, which includes Elita One, Huffer, Snarl, Springer, Strongarm, Swoop and Tryanotron in pursuit of the Decepticon Bug Bite and his forces to Earth. Once on Earth they contact Grimlock to aid them.

In the Beast Wars Shattered Glass story arc the G1 Ultra Magnus travels to Shattered Glass prehistoric Earth with Prowl, Ironhide, Silverbolt, and Grimlock. Adopting a wooly mammoth beast mode in order to survive the raw Energon radiation, he adopts the identity "Ultra Mammoth", which he attributes to Grimlock. With their home universe destroyed, Mammoth and his team did battle with Megatron's force of Decepticons, who had adopted alternative means of survival. Joined by an alternate version of Depth Charge, the former Autobots took on a new identity as Maximals. After a number of battles with Megatron's similarly renamed Predacons, Ultra Magnus gained possession of the Origin Matrix.

Ultra Mammoth and his comrades eventually made their way to the present of the Shattered Glass Universe, their own universe having been destroyed by the actions of Magnus' Shattered Glass counterpart. While most of his crew chose to take on normal Cybertronian forms, Ultra Mammoth retained his beast form, and through the heroic Galvatron learned that the Matrix he carried was a component of the Star Saber. He resolved to keep it until Nexus Prime returned, only to run afoul of his alternate self and engage him in a battle. The conflict was soon interrupted by Nexus Prime's arrival, and after sending the evil Magnus to another universe Nexus reclaimed the Matrix and resolved to use the Star Saber and Terminus Blade-the latter being reclaimed from Magnus-to prevent any other universes from suffering the same fate as Ultra Mammoth's.

Devil's Due Publishing
Ultra Magnus would make another appearance in the second G. I Joe vs. the Transformers crossover from Devil's Due Publishing, again as one of the leaders of the Autobot resistance to Shockwave. He and Perceptor saved a group of G. I Joes and Cobras from Shockwave's Decepticons, erecting a forcefield to protect them while they worked to repair the damage caused by Teletran-3, powered by Magnus' own strength. The shield eventually gave out and Magnus was captured. However, they were all rescued when the Dinobots returned and routed Shockwave's forces.

He reappeared in the third crossover as part of the combined Autobot/G. I Joe force attempting to rescue Optimus Prime, and even held off Trypticon single-handedly at one point. In the fourth crossover, Magnus was left in charge of the Autobot forces on Cybertron when Optimus Prime journeyed to Earth.

IDW Publishing

In issue #3 of The Transformers: Megatron Origin, a white colored Transformer (resembling Magnus' Titanium War Within toy) is seen from behind at the funeral of Bumper and Fastback. Whether this is actually Magnus is unclear.

In the new IDW Publishing continuity Magnus is a feared Autobot law enforcement officer. Magnus tracked down all those who broke the accords - be they Autobot or Decepticon. After arresting the Decepticon weapons dealer Swindle, the unscrupulous Decepticon managed to talk his way out of it by offering Magnus an even more tempting prize - the whereabouts of Scorponok. Despite his own personal reservations about doing so, Magnus agreed (planting a tracker on Swindle in the process) and tracked Scorponok down on the planet Nebulos. There he discovered the Decepticon's plan - upgrading several of the Nebulans with Transformer technology. Magnus soon found Scorponok himself and lost the subsequent fight. However, a shot from Scorponok's beast mode seemingly killed Scorponok's already upgraded partner Lord Zarak. Magnus managed to shoot Scorponok in the head, but the Decepticon escaped again. Much later, after apprehending Swindle (again), the Decepticon again attempted to deal his way out. He reappeared briefly again in the Spotlight issue on Arcee, where he tracked down, battled, and defeated the deranged Arcee, not realizing that the facility he was in was actually being used by Jhiaxus for the expansion.

Ultra Magnus also appears in the IDW ongoing series. He comes to Earth some three years after the events of the All Hail Megatron series, once again tracking Swindle. As acting Autobot commander, Bumblebee attempts to persuade Ultra Magnus to abandon his law enforcement duties and take up the fight against the Decepticons that still remained on Earth.

In The Transformers: More Than Meets the Eye, Ultra Magnus serves as second-in-command of star ship  'The Lost Light' under the command of Rodimus. Ultra Magnus being the 'Duly Appointed Enforcer of the Tyrest Accord'is in charge of judging and accessing the moral and ethical standing of the Lost Light's Crew. His initial role on the Lost Light, typified in his educating of Tailgate regarding the 'Autobot Code' "[Liking] to go through the code word by word, line by line, teasing out the implications" The crew of the Lost Light perceive Ultra Magnus as stringently stoic, "[Taking his] job and everything else extremely seriously", only ever "Smiling once and regretting it ever since." In Volume 15 Ultra Magnus is impaled at the hands of Overlord, presumed dead by the crew of the Lost Light. However, in the aftermath of their battle with Overlord, the crew go to collect the corpse of Ultra Magnus, only to find that it has inexplicably disappeared. It is then revealed that Ultra Magnus is an identity partially created by Chief Justice Tyrest; when the original Ultra Magnus died, Tyrest created a suit replicating Magnus' armour for an Autobot to wear, thus continuing the identity of Ultra Magnus to serve as the duly appointed enforcer of the Tyrest Accord long after the original's death. The current holder of the Magnus Armor is Minimus Ambus, which is revealed in the "Remain In Light" story arc. Ultra Magnus, along with other members of the Lost Light  who were double crossed by Getaway and laid in place a coup which ousted any members which befriended the now Autobot aligned Megatron. In 'Transformers More Than Meets The Eye's' second part 'The Lost Light, Ultra Magnus along with the other ousted Lost Light Survivors find themeselves on a revenge mission to get back the Lost Light and take down Getaway. In this chapter Minimus Ambus learns to grow more comfortable outside of the Magnus Armor.

 Minimus Ambus 
The Character of Minimus Ambus first appeared in IDW Publishing’s, ‘Transformers - More Than Meets The Eye’  Issue 18 and is first introduced as a prison in Luna 1, stating that he was “- a trader of, Energon derivatives and was consequently arrested by Ultra Magnus and sentenced to a thousand years within a prison on Luna 1 by Chief Justice Tyrest. However the façade of Minimus Ambus is uncovered by Rung  wherein, the aforementioned picks up on the “Pattern of [Minimus’] speech, his mannerisms, the intonation in his voice -” on top of the fact “The whole cell [was] filthy, apart from where [Minimus] was sitting” - “and the fact that [Minimus had] been staring at [Rung’s] chest ever since he put his badge  on at an angle.” To which Minimus reluctantly reveals himself to be Ultra Magnus. Not long after, it’s revealed that Minimus Ambus is the most recent in a line of Ultra Magnus’, that after his death, Chief Justice Tyrest believed that the perpetuation of Ultra Magnus was crucial for justice and law within Cybertronian culture; “People [loving] and fearing him in equal and [this] fascinated Chief Justice Tyrest.”, leading Chief Justice Tyrest to develop the ‘Magnus Armour’; “An opportunity to create the Immortal Lawman.” Minimus Ambus reveals that he is what is referred to as a 'Loadbearer' a form of 'Point One Percenter'  which allows him to bare 'Fully Integrated Neuroware' unlike most other cybertronians which have a “Low Breaking Strain”. By the end of the volume, Minimus goes against his role to uphold and enforce the 'Tryest Accord' , inferredly killing Chief Justice Tyrest in order to save the ‘Crew of The Lost Light’ and stop Tyrest’s ‘Kill Switch' . Minimus Ambus proceeds to go on with the Crew of the Lost Light for the remainder of the series, though readorning the Ultra Magnus armour and primarily being referred to as Ultra Magnus.

Binaltech
In the altered chronology of the Binaltech saga, Optimus Prime is still alive, having never had the final showdown with Megatron at the Battle of Autobot City. When Ravage arranges for the Autobots to be alone in the battle against the threat of Unicron, Optimus Prime and Ultra Magnus team up to take on the planet-eater, having discovered that the Matrix is the key to Unicron's destruction. Within Unicron's body, Optimus Prime is severely damaged, and although not fatally, he passes the Matrix to Ultra Magnus to complete the mission. Ultra Magnus sheds his outer armor and proceeds on, successfully opening the Matrix and initiating the destruction of Unicron. Magnus and Prime escape the exploding giant.

Other appearances
Ultra Magnus is the main character in the Famicom video game Transformers: Convoy no Nazo. The game is a typical side-scroller in which he battles Decepticons. This game has been poorly received.

Ultra Magnus appears among the Transformers box art on the back of larger third-year Transformers toys. He is flying in robot mode without his armor. For many years this was his only depiction in non-armored mode.

ToysGeneration 1 Ultra Magnus (1986)
Based on the Diaclone toy similar to Optimus Prime, Powered Convoy. Despite the fact that this toy has a smaller robot identical to Optimus Prime that can combine with the trailer for a super robot, he was only depicted in super mode in the animated series and Marvel comics. According to the U.S. patent for this toy, the head and chest plate of the super robot mode combine to form a jet with a gun turret on it. Several variations of this toy were released, with varying amounts of paint applications and with rubber or plastic tires on his trailer.
Like many previous Transformers toys, the Ultra Magnus toy was a carry-over from the Japanese Diaclone line, where it was released in silver, red, and dark blue colors as "Powered Convoy," a powered-up version of "Battle Convoy," the toy which had become Optimus Prime, hence the identical cabs. Additionally, the Diaclone toy's instructions included several more alternate modes the toy could be configured into, which were omitted from Ultra Magnus's instructions in the US release. In the Japanese release of the Ultra Magnus character, however, two of these additional modes are kept, while the third (a battle station) is replaced with another battle station mode with a completely different arrangement.
It is worth noting that Powered Convoy's original colors may have at one point been intended to be kept for the Ultra Magnus character -- an early promotional film advertising Transformers: The Movie features Ultra Magnus animated in these hues. In line with this, when the original Ultra Magnus toy was re-issued in Japan in 2000, a limited-edition version in the Diaclone colors was also released, referred to as a "Movie Edition"; this deco would later be used as the basis for a comics-exclusive character named Delta Magnus. A third version also saw release, cast entirely in translucent yellow, intended to represent the moment that Magnus is caught in the light of the Matrix.
Ultra Magnus' toy consists of a smaller robot, identical to Optimus Prime but with a mostly white coloration, which acts as the cab of the car carrier and combines with the trailer to form the familiar Ultra Magnus as depicted in the cartoon and comics. The white "inner robot" would not appear in official fiction until the publication of the Dreamwave comics, but was alluded to by the coating applied to Optimus Prime in The Return Of Optimus Prime.Generation 1 Kabaya Gum Ultra Magnus (1986)
Part of the original gum toy series by Kabaya. Each package comes with a stick of chewing gum and an easy-to-assemble kit. The completed robot looks and transforms almost the same as the larger, original Takara version. The car carrier can accommodate Mini-Car figures (Bumblebee, Cliffjumper, etc.) and most World's Smallest Transformers figures.Generation 2 Ultra Magnus (1993)
A collectable watch that looked like Ultra Magnus' super robot mode was released in Generation 2Generation 1 Reissue Ultra Magnus (2002)
The reissue of Ultra Magnus in 2002 had elongated missiles and shortened smokestacks to comply with new child safety laws.Universe Deluxe Ultra Magnus with Over-Run (2004)
The toy for this version of Ultra Magnus is a white recolor of the Armada Deluxe Optimus Prime and Over-Run toy. There was an error in the assembly of the toy where the lower parts of his arms were swapped with each other, meaning he could not bend his arms up at the elbows fully unless they are fixed.Masterpiece MP-02 Ultra Magnus (2005)
A white redeco of Masterpiece Optimus Prime that comes with a Megatron in gun mode, Energon axe, and the Matrix of Leadership.Generation 2 Laser Ultra Magnus (2006)
When the Generation 2 Laser Optimus Prime figure was reissued in Japan in 2006, online retailer eHobby offered an exclusive repainted version of it as a new version of the original Ultra Magnus, referencing - as other toylines had also since done - the connection between the original Prime and Magnus toys. As a repaint of Laser Optimus Prime, Ultra Magnus has light-up eyes and headlights, and a sword and gun which can also be illuminated when placed in his fist. His trailer can, via a spring-loaded mechanism, transform into a heavily armed battle station with a five-shot missile launcher, disc shooter, and bellows-activated foam-tipped rocket launcher.
The extensive bio for this toy reveals that after Magnus lost his life in a Decepticon attack, he was welcomed into the Allspark, his spark retaining its individuality like the other ancient Autobot leaders due to his brief ownership of the Matrix of Leadership. Magnus, however, did not feel that he truly belonged there, and, through the cosmic awareness that comes with being part of the Matrix, learned that Galvatron II was threatening the galaxy. Making contact with Optimus Prime's consciousness, Magnus used the power of Prime's "Reconfiguration Matrix" - the means by which Prime had adopted numerous body forms in the G2 line - to bring about his own resurrection. With the power of the Reconfiguration Matrix, Magnus is able to adopt several different forms of his own, including his original body, but has selected a duplicate version of Prime's "Laser Rod" form for particularly comprehensive offensive power.Classics Ultra Magnus (2007)
A two pack of Ultra Magnus (repaint of Classics Voyager Optimus Prime) and Skywarp (repaint of Classics Deluxe Starscream) made a Target Store exclusive. The pack was sold under the name "Battle for Autobot City".
A later released 2-pack included Classic Optimus Prime and Ultra Magnus.Titanium 6 inch War Within Ultra Magnus (2007)
Two different toys of Ultra Magnus appeared in the Titanium line. The first is a repaint of the 6" inch War Within Optimus Prime in white colors.Titanium 6 inch Generation 1 Ultra Magnus (2007)
The second is a new 6" inch Titanium transforming mold which resembles his Generation 1 form. Only features vehicle and super-robot modes, with no separate smaller robot mode, as the trailer does not disconnect from the cab.Convoy feat. Nike Free 7.0 Ultra Magnus (2007)
A special repaint of the Optimus Prime from the "Transformers: Sports Label" series in Ultra Magnus' colors were released. However, it was still packaged under the name Convoy and is therefore still identified as a version of Optimus Prime.Alternity Ultra Magnus Featuring Nissan GT-R (2010)
An eHobby exclusive (Japan) and TF China Carnival (China) exclusive white redeco of the Alternity Convoy figure.Generation 1 Kabaya Gum 25th Anniversary Ultra Magnus (2010)
The 25th-anniversary gum toy is not a reissue of the original 1985 toy; instead, it appears to be based on the Titanium design.Timelines Ultra Mammoth (2013)
A TFCC exclusive repaint of Big Convoy with a color scheme based on G1 Ultra Magnus.

Transformers: Robots in Disguise

The first new character to bear the name of Ultra Magnus since the Generation 1 original was known as God Magnus in the Japanese 2000 line, Transformers: Car Robots. God Magnus owed his name and alternate mode to Ultra Magnus (and also to Godbomber, an earlier character who disassembled to form armor for his Prime-styled partner), so when the series was translated for release in the West in 2001 as Transformers: Robots in Disguise, the name change was obvious, and Ultra Magnus returned to TV screens for the first time since the G1 series. Later, a smaller Spy Changer figure of Magnus, unique to Robots in Disguise, was released

Ultra Magnus transforms into a car carrier capable of transporting other Autobots such as the Autobot Brothers. In addition to his remarkable strength and fighting ability, he is armed with the "Blue Bolts" - a variable-configuration weapon of immense destructive power.  His weapon can either fire as a rapid-fire gun or as a high-powered laser. His back-mounted jetpack allows for periods of the short flight. In addition to these new abilities, for the first time, was able to combine with Optimus Prime (Robots In Disguise toyline) forming Omega Prime.

 Animated series 
As a nod to their origins in Generation 1 Ultra Magnus and Optimus Prime (Fire Convoy in Japan) were created at the same time by Alpha Trion, but when Prime was chosen to carry the Matrix by Vector Sigma, Magnus felt passed over, jealous and was left carrying a hatred against his brother. That grudge eventually exploded into violence when he arrived on Earth with the intention of taking what he believed was rightfully his - by force, if necessary.  Before meeting up with Optimus, Magnus fought and easily defeated the Decepticons on his own (not even Ruination could beat him). When he met Optimus, he offered Magnus a chance to join him, but Magnus outright refused and attacked him. Severely injuring Prime, who refused to fight back, Magnus tracked him to a desert island, where he pretended to offer him the hand of friendship, only to attempt to absorb the Matrix for himself, forcing the brothers into the combined form of Omega Prime (God Fire Convoy). Through this link, Magnus was also able to channel the power of the Matrix, which he used to supercharge the Autobot Brothers into newly colored forms. Although Magnus remained a free agent, refusing to take orders from his brother, his animosity dwindled, and he frequently helped the Autobots by combining with Prime to battle the Predacons and Decepticons. As Omega Prime, they faced Galvatron together at the Earth's core and defeated him once and for all.

Note that in Car Robots, there is not one singular Matrix, but multiple ones, each held by a high-ranking Autobot. Magnus already possesses a Matrix, and simply seeks to steal the power of Prime's to increase his own (the overspill resulting in the supercharging of the Autobot Brothers).

 Dreamwave Productions 
The character also made one appearance in Dreamwave Productions' Summer Special in a story presented as being in continuity with the animated series, which pitted him against Scourge, as both denied and debated their Autobot heritage and relation to Optimus Prime. No further RiD stories were published by Dreamwave before their closure, as Beast Wars claimed victory over RiD in a poll to choose the next mini-series.

3H Enterprises
Three versions of Ultra Magnus would appear in the BotCon exclusive Transformers: Universe storyline.

Although the Robots in Disguise incarnation of Ultra Magnus did not return to TV screens, his toy was re-released on the shelves of Sam's Club in 2003's parallel-universe-spanning Transformers: Universe line, slightly redecorated with bluish-black parts in place of his dark blue ones. Featured in the pages of the Transformers: Universe comic book exclusive to the Official Transformers Collectors Convention, this character was established to the RiD Magnus, who, along with Optimus Prime, was plucked from his home universe at a point after the conclusion of Robots in Disguise to become part of a battle between armies gathered from across space and time by Unicron and Primus. Led by Optimus Primal into the final battle, the combatants found their conflict halted when Unicron began to crumble beneath them. Primal's team gathered together to escape through a portal, but when Magnus and Prime passed through, they did not find themselves where they expected...

In another universe, an Autobot bearing a great physical resemblance to Ultra Magnus called Ultra Trion appeared, being killed by the Decepticon leader Megazarak. According to series artist Dan Khanna in a message board response, Ultra Trion was meant to be an alternate universe counterpart to Ultra Magnus, who acted as Alpha Trion's successor until his demise. Ultra Trion was later retconned into being a version of Ultra Magnus, who merged with a dying Alpha Trion in an alternate future version of a Robot in Disguise universe, where Cybertron is ruled by Megazarak and the Autobots are near-extinct.

Yet another version of Ultra Magnus appeared, in the 2004 BotCon voice actor play, and this character was seemingly yet another new Ultra Magnus taken from a parallel dimension to that of the Robots in Disguise fiction. The toy for this version of Ultra Magnus is a recolor of the Robots in Disguise toy and came packaged with Ironhide. This package was a Walmart store exclusive in 2004. The Voice Actor Drama was written for OFTCC 2004 by Simon Furman, set after the events in the comics. Spy Changers Optimus Prime, Prowl, Ultra Magnus, and Ironhide were among those taken from their world via teleportation beam by Unicron and his Decepticon minions. The Autobot forces opposing Unicron attempted to deflect the beam, which left them all trapped on an uninhabited ice-world. The Autobot forces teamed up to overcome the Decepticons led by Reptilion. Presumably, the Autobots were then returned to their own worlds.

Fun Publications
Prime and Magnus's toys were released once more in 2005's Transformers: Cybertron - exclusively to Costco, with Magnus's toy remaining unchanged from his Universe redeco - with bios which once again presented them to be the same characters from RiD and Universe.  It was within the pages of the Cybertron comic available through the Official Transformers Collectors Club that the story was continued, as the portal through which Magnus and Prime had vanished in Universe transported them into the Cybertron universe; there, a black hole left in the wake of Unicron's destruction in that universe had caused multiversal ripples which had resulted in the collapse of Unicron in the Universe timeline the brothers had just departed, and materialized on Cybertron...

In the Cybertron universe, Cybertron was under attack by two of the Heralds of Unicron, Nemesis Prime and Ramjet. They had already damaged Alpha Trion, and while Ramjet engaged Vector Prime in a duel high above Cybertron, Nemesis Prime got past Sentinel Maximus and revealed his plan - he was going to use the Dead Matrix, a corrupted version of the Matrix of Leadership, to drain the lifeforce of Primus and use it to revive Unicron (destroyed in a black hole at the conclusion of Transformers: Energon). But he was confronted by the most unexpected foe of all - Omega Prime. Omega then split into Optimus Prime and Ultra Magnus, and while Prime attended to Primus, Magnus defeated Nemesis Prime. Informing Sentinel Maximus of what went on, they then stored the Dead Matrix away forever, unaware they were being observed by Soundwave.

Soundwave subsequently stole the Dead Matrix and threw it into the black hole, reviving Unicron, who took a nearby planet as his new body. Unicron attacked Cybertron again in the midst of a Mini-Con civil war, dueling with Sentinel Maximus and Omega Prime. The battle was inconclusive, but Unicron was driven away by Primus himself. The brothers recovered - only to receive Optimus Prime, bearing word of Vector Prime's death in battle. Prime and Magnus were subsequently seen planning the hunt for Unicron.

 Toys 
A God Magnus Leader Class figure was released in 2000, which transforms from car carrier to robot. In-car carrier mode, he can hold up to three Deluxe-sized cars (most notably the Car Brothers from the Car Robots series). His main weapon fires spring-loaded missiles and can fold into three different configurations. This battery-operated figure features truck horn sounds, weapons sound effects, and voice samples of God Magnus. Combines with Fire Convoy (sold separately) to form God Fire Convoy. Once combined, God Fire Convoy emits different sound effects and voice clips ("Chou-Kyoudai Gattai! God Fire Convoy!" and "God Fire!"). A Toys "R" Us Japan exclusive gift set was offered in late 2000, featuring God Magnus and Super Fire Convoy packaged with the God Sword (a repaint of the sword from the Japanese G1 Fortress Maximus).

Its American counterpart, Robots in Disguise Leader Ultra Magnus, was originally released in 2001. It is similar to the Japanese release, only with the Japanese voice replaced with the English voice (with the phrase, "Ultra Magnus, Transform!"). Autobot emblems have been placed on the side panels in this version. Much like the Japanese version, this figure combines with Optimus Prime's normal robot mode to form Omega Prime, with a different set of voice and sound clips ("Optimus Prime, Ultra Magnus, Combine!" and "Omega Fire!").

A Robots in Disguise Spy Changer Ultra Magnus was released in 2002. The Spy Changer of Ultra Magnus was repainted as the Dairycon 2002 exclusive figure Campaign Car.

Transformers: Energon

It was in the second installment of the Unicron trilogy, Transformers: Energon, that the Overload toy was repainted into Ultra Magnus's blue, white and red colors and released in the west under the name "Ultra Magnus" in a limited production run.

The Energon version of Ultra Magnus, like all the recolorations of Armada toys featured in the early stages of the toyline, never appeared in the TV show or the Dreamwave comic.

The Transformers: Energon Ultra Magnus figure features a smaller mini-con figure named Knock Out that transforms and combines with a larger robot action figure that transforms into a trailer. When the 2 figures merge together, They become the Energon version of Ultra Magnus

Although Transformers: Cybertron, the third installment of the "Unicron Trilogy" timeline, saw Robots in Disguise Magnus enter its timeline, it was not without its own characters bearing the name. The Transformers: Armada toyline was the first to re-use Magnus' name, although not in the west - in Japan, where the character known as Overload in English was named Ultra Magnus. It was not an ill-fitting name, as the first, unpainted pictures of the toy had caused speculation that it was intended to be a new version of Magnus, bearing as it does his stylistic shoulder design.

Fun Publications
Ultra Magnus appeared in the text story from Fun Publications called Force of Habit. This story explained where he was during the events of the Cybertron story. Ultra Magnus is commander of various Autobot ships sent to other planets in search of the Cyber Planet Keys. He also serves as captain of the Iron Hope which was crewed by Bonecrusher, Grimlock, Ironhide, Knock Out, Overcast, Prowl, Quickstrike, RipTide, Skyblast, Smokescreen, Swoop, Wreckage and the Sky Scorcher Mini-Con Team.

"Ask Vector Prime" later revealed that Ultra Magnus previous possessed a form similar to Optimus Prime's, but that he was rebuilt using the schematics of Overload after being badly damaged in battle with Treadshot.

Toys
This version of Ultra Magnus is a recolor of Armada Overload. It was released in 2004 and came with a recolor of the Armada Space Mini-Con team. The Transformers: Universe white and blue repaint of Armada Optimus Prime designated Ultra Magnus was also incorporated into this version of the character.

Transformers Cinematic Universe
In 2007, USA Today polled people as to which Transformer they want to appear in the next Transformers film. Ultra Magnus came in tied for fourth with Shockwave. Ultra Magnus was considered to appear in Transformers: Dark of the Moon, before the role was given to Sentinel Prime. The design that was intended to be used for the character is seen briefly during the film's prologue, repurposed as the design of a generic deceased Autobot. To date, it is unknown if Ultra Magnus will appear in any future movies.
Transformers Animated

In the Cartoon Network series Transformers Animated, Ultra Magnus serves as the Autobot commander on Cybertron and Optimus Prime's superior and father figure, he believes Optimus has the potential to be a born leader, despite being kicked out of Autobot Academy. His head resembles that of the Generation 1 character's super robot mode. He wields a large war hammer called the Magnus Hammer, which can discharge massive amounts of electricity and command lightning bolts. He turns into an 8-wheeled missile launcher truck. In doing Ultra Magnus' voice, Jeff Bennett emulates the voice of Robert Stack, who voiced Magnus in The Transformers: The Movie.

Animated series
Ultra Magnus is the incumbent Supreme Commander of the Autobots and led his faction through the Great War with the Decepticons. During the war, Ultra Magnus commissioned Project Omega as a desperate measure to defeat the Decepticons, despite his regret that the Autobots were creating a series of living doomsday weapons. After Ultra Magnus led the Autobots to victory, the Decepticons were exiled from Cybertron, leaving the planet at peace. Ultra Magnus later regretfully expelled Optimus from the Autobot Elite Guard after he assumed responsibility for the apparent death of Elita-1. However, due to liking Optimus and suspecting that Sentinel was not telling the whole truth of the incident, he promoted him to Optimus Prime and gave him command of the stasis-locked Omega Supreme.

In the pilot of Transformers Animated Ultra Magnus learned that's crew had discovered the Allspark and ordered them to stay put until it could be retrieved. He also told Prime not to try to be a hero; unfortunately, Optimus disobeyed and had the ship take off anyway, stating that "Ultra Magnus wasn't carrying the Allspark". Ultra Magnus comes to Earth personally in the episode "The Elite Guard" with his fellow Cybertron Elite Guard members Sentinel Prime and Jazz. He took on an Earth-vehicle mode. After the battle against some out-of-control police droids and a fragment of the Allspark was retrieved, Ultra Magnus began to respect Optimus Prime as a commander and told Sentinel Prime that he can learn a thing or two from him. During "Mission Accomplished", he informs Optimus and his crew to pack up and get ready to head back to Cybertron, believing that Optimus is emboldening the Decepticons with his shaky claims Megatron's return. Ultra Magnus is convinced of the Decepticon presence on Earth by a battle with Starscream and departs to deal with Decepticon attacks on Autobot space bridges, entrusting Optimus' crew with the protection of Earth.

In "TransWarped", Ultra Magnus realizes that the uprisings were too organized and deduced that Cybertron may have a double agent. He then sends Sentinel and Jazz to Earth to get an update from the Earthbound Autobots. In "Where Is Thy Sting?", Longarm Prime (Shockwave) is outed as the traitor, and Magnus is savagely attacked and barely able to reveal the identity of his attacker to Ironhide. According to Alpha Trion in "Decepticon Air", Ultra Magnus is currently on "spark-support". By this time, Sentinel Prime takes over as the new Magnus. In "This Is Why I Hate Machines", the attack by Shockwave and the image of Ultra Magnus in the infirmary are used as propaganda in Sentinel's fanatical government policies. While on spark-support, Ultra Magnus is nearly destroyed by his own hammer when Shockwave attacks the infirmary but is saved by Ratchet, who takes the hammer with him to Earth and promises to return it once Ultra Magnus recovers.

For a time, Ultra Magnus's ultimate fate was not revealed before the end of the series, but Derrick J. Wyatt stated that if a fourth season of the show was made, Magnus was to have died from his injuries.

Toys
The first toy for this version of Ultra Magnus was released in 2008 and transformed from a Heavy Expanded Mobility Tactical Truck to the robot. He came with a spring-loaded Magnus Hammer and is armed with numerous guns mounted on his shoulders. The figure emits two sound effects and phrases as voiced by Jeff Bennett. This toy was later recolored in a green, black, and orange theme, in a homage to the Generation 1 robot superhero Roadbuster. The version released in Japan in 2010 had metallic paint and Japanese voice clips.

Transformers: Prime

Ultra Magnus is the leader of the Wreckers, and Optimus Prime's second-in-command. Like the Animated version of the character, this Ultra Magnus carries a hammer, in actuality a depleted Forge of Solus Prime, while like his IDW depiction, he is stern and takes no-nonsense.

Animated Series
Ultra Magnus appears in the third season of Transformers: Prime, entitled Beast Hunters. He is revealed to be Optimus Prime's second-in-command, who survived the war for Cybertron. He is a by-the-book commander, requesting that the subordinate Autobots, with the exception of Ratchet, and even the humans address him as "sir".

Though he is not mentioned by name prior to his arrival, his image-or a very similar one-appeared when the amnesiac Optimus Prime, then going by Orion Pax, looked up Optimus Prime in the Decepticon database. Ultra Magnus himself arrives on Earth in "Scattered" and meets with Arcee and Jack. Like Wheeljack, he has his own personal vessel, though he is a good deal larger.

In "Prey," Ultra Magnus tells Jack and Arcee that he detected five Autobot life signatures that remained online. Ultra Magnus also mentioned that he had encountered other Autobots during his travels, many of which perished in Decepticon attacks. Later, he helps Bulkhead, Wheeljack and Miko escape from the Predacon named Predaking before finding Ratchet, Bumblebee, and Raf at the Harbinger and meeting Agent Fowler and June Darby. Ultra Magnus decides that the Autobots must defeat Megatron once and for all and, after taking command, offers them a large supply of weapons to assist in the fight.

In "Rebellion", Ultra Magnus leads the assault on Darkmount, where Predaking is sent through a Ground Bridge into the Antarctic. Magnus goes after Megatron but is defeated. Before the Autobots can be executed, a recently repaired Optimus Prime arrives and destroys Darkmount. Later, Magnus gives Optimus command over the Autobots again.

In "Project Predacon", Ultra Magnus' vehicle form is revealed, a nearly all-blue version of Optimus' semi-truck form. It is also revealed that he had been put in charge of the Wreckers back on Cybertron during the war, as he felt there needed to be someone to keep them in order. Once again taking charge of the Wreckers on Earth, Ultra Magnus also takes the Forge of Solus Prime as a new weapon, as it had no more power and he wanted to give it a "practical use".

In "Chain of Command", Ultra Magnus constantly criticizes Wheeljack's actions, such as attacking without orders and bringing Miko along. It is revealed that Ultra Magnus becoming the leader of the Wreckers was the reason that Wheeljack deserted. When fighting Predaking in the mine and losing, Magnus once again criticizes Wheeljack for detonating a grenade in a confined space. Ultimately Wheeljack deserts the Wreckers once again, though he returns to the Autobot base back in Nevada. This is shown in the episode "Plus One", in which Ultra Magnus, Bulkhead, and Miko return to Nevada in Magnus' ship instead of by ground bridge, bringing with them the reclaimed Apex Armor.

In "Evolution", Ultra Magnus begins to realize that the Autobots aren't very welcoming towards him, not just Wheeljack. He turns to Optimus, the only one who doesn't treat him the same way, for advice, but the conversation is interrupted by a mission to what is believed to be a Decepticon Energon mine, and he takes the Wreckers inside of the mine with Smokescreen. He and Wheeljack stumble upon Shockwave's Predacon cloning lab and proceed to battle him, but Shockwave escapes and the Predacons begin to awaken. Wheeljack detonates a grenade next to the synthetic Energon, and they attempt to make their escape, just as Predaking arrives. Predaking is enraged by the loss of his Predacon brethren and tries to kill the two Autobots. The Wreckers put up more of a fight against Predaking in his robot mode, but eventually are defeated. Predaking crushes Magnus's hand by stepping on it and destroys the Forge of Solus Prime. When he is about to kill them, Optimus Prime comes in and saves them both. Magnus is later being treated by Ratchet, and Optimus answers his earlier question, explaining that the bond of family is greater than that of any army.

Ultra Magnus continues to work the Autobots, with a metal claw as a replacement for his destroyed hand. He leads the Wreckers in the final battle against the Decepticons in "Deadlock", until the Decepticons are defeated upon the death of Megatron, and witnesses the revival of Cybertron through the use of the Omega Lock.

In the TV movie, Predacons Rising, Ultra Magnus is left in command while Optimus goes to retrieve the Allspark. When investigating the Sea of Rust with Smokescreen, they come across two Predacons, Skylynx and Darksteel. Magnus tries to fight off Skylynx, but is brutally beaten by him, and barely escapes with Smokescreen's help. He spends the rest of the movie under Ratchet's medical attention. He is however seen, still on a medical chair, when Optimus sacrifices himself for Cybertron's restoration with the AllSpark.

He and many others made a cameo in Robots in Disguise.

Books
Ultra Magnus appears in the novel Transformers: Exodus, its sequel, Transformers: Exiles, and Transformers: Retribution, the third installment in the series. Unlike the animated series, the Wreckers form around Ultra Magnus, who becomes a leading figure amongst the early Autobots. Wielding a powerful hammer, Magnus eventually became leader of the Autobot resistance to Shockwave on Cybertron following the departure of the Ark and the Nemesis. Ultra Magnus and his team played a role in the Ark's successful departure, delaying Trypticon and the Decepticons long enough for the Ark to be launched. He then takes up leadership of the Autobot forces resisting Shockwave's domination of the planet, corresponding with Alpha Trion and leading his Wreckers into battle against the enemy. In Retribution his role is expanded when Alpha Trion is taken prisoner by Shockwave and experimented upon, prompting him to assemble several Wreckers along with Jetfire and Omega Supreme to liberate the captured Prime. Their plan would be further complicated by an invasion of Sharkticons sent by the Quintessons to reclaim Cybertron, but they eventually escaped with the aid of the bar owner Maccadam.

IDW Publishing
Ultra Magnus also appeared in the Transformers: Prime comic mini-series, Rage of the Dinobots. Like many Autobots, he developed something of an aversion to the Dinobots due to their altered nature. Due to his rigid personality, he also looked unfavorably upon their combat tactics. However, after they played a significant role in enabling him to depart Cybertron, Magnus came to respect the Dinobots as comrades.

Ultra Magnus makes a cameo, along with Arcee and Bulkhead, in the Transformers: Robots in Disguise comic, secretly observing Bumblebee and his team fight a Decepticon bird named Flamefeather. He along with Arcee and Bulkhead meet Team Bee during a conflict with Clipshade in issue 2

Games
Ultra Magnus appears as a character in the Nintendo DS game Transformers: War for Cybertron - Autobots. He is a level boss that must be defeated, which unlocks him as a playable character. He is also available in the Decepticons version of the game. If the sewer level with Motormaster is played with Autobot characters, Ultra Magnus is used to replacing Motormaster.

Ultra Magnus is available as downloadable content for Transformers: Fall of Cybertron.

Toys
 Prime Cyberverse Commander Ultra Magnus (2012)
 Generations Fall of Cybertron Ultra Magnus (not yet released)
Recolor of Fall of Cybertron Optimus Prime figure, with different head.

 Prime Voyager Class Ultra Magnus (2012)
A new mold, based on the character's design in the show, he transforms into a blue truck that resembles his G1 and Animated counterparts. He comes with a large gun that doubles as a hammer, and a missile.

 Prime Beast Hunters Cyberverse Commander Ultra Magnus (2013)
 Prime Beast Hunters Voyager Ultra Magnus (2013)
Recolor of "Prime Voyager Class Optimus Prime" with two shoulder-mounted missile launchers added. Comes with the "Forge of Solus Prime", and a removable jetpack that looks like the one from "Beast Hunters" Optimus Prime.

 Prime Weaponizer Ultra Magnus (Platinum Series) (2013)
Recolor and mold of the Prime Weaponizer Optimus Prime figure. Comes with the "Forge of Solus Prime Battle Hammer".

Transformers: Timelines (Shattered Glass)

Ultra Magnus is one of the evil Autobots in Fun Publications' Shattered Glass universe. In this universe, he is also Optimus Prime's younger brother, and formerly one of the chief lieutenants in the Autobot dictatorship.

Fun Publications
However, he eventually staged a failed coup against Prime and had his face ripped away for his trouble, leaving him with a skeletal visage. Exiled to Paradron, he eventually formed an alliance with Wreck-Gar and others, obtaining the Omega Blade and copying Optimus's latest form in preparation to make another grab for power. This would lead to an invasion of the Classics universe, which was eventually destroyed as a result of Magnus' actions while its version of Earth was transported to Magnus' home universe. This would subsequently be revealed to be part of a scheme to harvest the energy of destroyed universes and use it against Optimus, but Magnus ran into unexpected opposition when his counterpart from the universe he destroyed, now known as Ultra Mammoth, engaged him and was exposed to a reaction of the Origin Matrix carried by him. This caused him to briefly go on a rampage until he was subdued by the arrival of Nexus Prime, who promptly claimed the Omega Blade for his own use. Magnus attempted to escape, but Nexus banished him into another reality and trapped him there before setting out to ensure that a plan such as his could never be employed again.

ToysTimelines Deluxe Ultra Magnus''' (2012)
A BotCon 2012 exclusive blue redeco of Reveal the Shield Deluxe Optimus Prime figure with a different head sculpt.

Ultra Magnus' original form is depicted by the Universe toy, which is a repaint of Armada'' Optimus Prime.

Angry Birds Transformers
Alongside Optimus Prime, The character Red plays Ultra Magnus as a playable character in Angry Birds Transformers.

References

Bibliography

External links
Ultra Magnus at the Transformers Wiki

Film characters introduced in 1986
Transformers characters
Fictional characters with superhuman strength
Fictional commanders
Fictional generals
Fictional hammer fighters
Fictional lieutenants
Video game bosses
Male characters in film
Male characters in animated series